The modern Bishop Suffragan of Dorchester in the Diocese of Oxford, usually contracted to Bishop of Dorchester, is an episcopal title used by an area bishop of the Church of England Diocese of Oxford, in the Province of Canterbury, England. The Bishop of Dorchester, along with the Bishop of Buckingham and the Bishop of Reading, assists the Diocesan Bishop of Oxford in overseeing the diocese.

The title takes its name from the town of Dorchester-on-Thames in Oxfordshire, and was first used by the historic Bishops of Dorchester: at first for a West Saxon diocese (see Bishop of Winchester), and later for a Mercian diocese (see Bishop of Lincoln). The suffragan See was erected by Order-in-Council (under the Suffragans Nomination Act 1888) on 2 February 1939. The bishops suffragan of Dorchester have been area bishops since the Oxford area scheme was founded in 1984.

List of bishops

References

External links
 Crockford's Clerical Directory - Listings

 
Anglican suffragan bishops in the Diocese of Oxford